G. Simon Harak  (1948-2019) was an American peace activist and professor of theology and Director of the Center for Peacemaking at Marquette University.

From 2003 to January 2007, Harak served as the Anti-Militarism Coordinator of the National Office of the War Resisters League. He also helped found Voices in the Wilderness, which was nominated for the Nobel Peace Prize in 2001, 2002, and 2003.  Harak was named "Metro New York Peacemaker of the Year" and "National Peacemaker of the Year" by Pax Christi Metro New York and Pax Christi Long Island in 2005.

Born in Derby, Connecticut, Harak earned his Bachelor of Arts degree from Fairfield University, a Master of Divinity degree from the Jesuit School of Theology at Berkeley, and Master of Arts and Doctor of Philosophy degrees in ethics from the University of Notre Dame. He died on November 3, 2019, of a rare form of dementia.

See also
 List of peace activists

References

External links
Network of Arab-American Professionals Profile
G. Simon Harak speaks of Empire and community Video

1948 births
2019 deaths
20th-century American Roman Catholic theologians
21st-century American Roman Catholic theologians
American anti-war activists
American Christian pacifists
20th-century American Jesuits
21st-century American Jesuits
Catholic pacifists
Fairfield University alumni
Jesuit theologians
Marquette University faculty
Roman Catholic moral theologians
University of Notre Dame alumni
War Resisters League activists